Alison Nicole Luff (born December 20, 1988) is an American singer and stage actress. She is best known for her extensive work in musical theatre, notably for her roles as Elphaba in the First National Tour of Wicked and Jenna in the Broadway production of Waitress.

Early life 
Alison Luff was born on December 20, 1988, in Spring, Texas. Since childhood, she had a passion for theater, which grew as she grew up. At age 6, she began singing and dancing with Encore Youth Performers. One year later, she began acting in community theater, and at age 10, she began acting in professional theater. She attended Klein Collins High School, where she was involved in almost every one of her school's theater productions. As Éponine in her school's production of Les Miserables, she was nominated for best actress at the Tommy Tune Awards, and as Annabel Glick in her school's production of Lucky Stiff, she won best actress at an awards ceremony at the Hobby Center for the Performing Arts. Instead of attending college, she worked and performed to save money to move to New York City.

Career 
Luff made her Broadway debut in the ensemble of Mamma Mia, understudying the roles of Ali and Sophie. She departed the production on January 1, 2012. She also performed the same track on the second national tour. She then understudied Carolee Carmello as Aimee Semple McPherson in the short-lived Broadway musical, Scandalous.

She then went on to star in the Broadway production of Ghost as an understudy for the role of Molly, which was played by Caissie Levy.

Luff made her Wicked debut on April 30, 2013 with the 1st National Tour, alongside Jennifer Gambatese as Glinda. She took a short break from Elphaba July 2 to 7, 2013, in which time the role was played by Dee Roscioli. She played her final performance as Elphaba on April 20, 2014, with Gina Beck as Glinda. She was replaced by Emma Hunton as Elphaba.

Luff played Miss Honey in the Broadway production of Matilda, in which she performed from September 6, 2014, to September 6, 2015. She played Charlie Jane in the Pasadena Playhouse production of Breaking Through until the end of the show's run on November 22, 2015. Luff then starred as Fantine in the second Broadway revival of Les Misérables from February 2016 until the production's closing in September 2016. From October 20 to December 2nd, 2017, Luff starred in the pre-Broadway tour of Escape to Margaritaville as Rachel. She reprised her role in the Broadway production from March 15 to July 1, 2018. She also starred as Jenna in Waitress from July 23, 2019, to September 15, 2019.

References

External links
 

American stage actresses
1988 births
21st-century American women singers
People from Spring, Texas
Living people
21st-century American singers